Oleg Cretul (born 21 February 1975) is a Moldovan judoka. He competed in the men's half-middleweight event at the 1996 Summer Olympics.

Achievements

References

External links
 

1975 births
Living people
Moldovan male judoka
Olympic judoka of Moldova
Judoka at the 1996 Summer Olympics
20th-century Moldovan people